Arline M. Fantin (born September 26, 1937) is a former American politician.

From Calumet City, Illinois, Fantin went to American Floral Art School. She served as the assessor for the Thornton Township, Cook County, Illinois. Fantin served in the Illinois House of Representatives from 1995 to 1999 and was a Democrat.

Notes

1937 births
Living people
People from Calumet City, Illinois
Women state legislators in Illinois
Democratic Party members of the Illinois House of Representatives
21st-century American women